Rodrigo Damín (born 1 April 1998) is an Argentine professional footballer who plays as a forward.

Career
Damín played in the youth academy of Tigre. In 2017, Damín joined Primera B Metropolitana side Almirante Brown. He made his professional debut on 20 May against Comunicaciones, prior to featuring again in their 2016–17 season finale against Deportivo Español on 30 June.

Career statistics
.

References

External links

1998 births
Living people
People from Escobar Partido
Argentine footballers
Association football forwards
Primera B Metropolitana players
Club Almirante Brown footballers
Sportspeople from Buenos Aires Province